Robert Tracy (1955 – June 7, 2007) was an American dancer, writer, and educator in New York City. He taught dance history as an associate professor at Fordham University and published well-reviewed books. During his life, he was better known for his literary work, even though he was a talented dancer; he dedicated his life to academia and writing books.  Tracy became, as a secondary duty, the personal assistant to his live-in partner Rudolf Nureyev. After Nureyev's death, Tracy dedicated his life to AIDS awareness and LGBT legal advocacy.

Early life and education
Robert Tracy was born in Boston, in 1955, the son of an English teacher. He grew up in a culturally dynamic home in Massachusetts. Tracy initially earned a bachelor's degree in performing arts, classical studies and dance from Skidmore College. Upon graduation, he attended studies in Greek and Latin, as well as classical ballet dance at New York University, where he was encouraged to train as a professional dancer. He was eventually accepted at the George Balanchine's School of American Ballet, and in 1979 he was one of a few students hand picked by Balanchine to perform in Le Bourgeois Gentilhomme, a work the Russian-born choreographer created for Nureyev.

Career
He became an associate professor at Fordham University, teaching Dance History.

In 1983 his first book, Balanchine's Ballerinas: Conversations With the Muses, was published by Simon & Schuster; described by The Wall Street Journal as "this year's great ballet book."

Subsequent books included Goddess: Martha Graham's Dancers Remember (1997) and Ailey Spirit: The Journey of an American Dance Company (2004), both published by Limelight.

Tracy reportedly worked as an editor. He edited Nigel Gosling's Prowling the Pavements: Selected Writings From London, 1950-1980 (Winchell, 1986) and contributed to Isamu Noguchi's 1994 anthology Essays and Conversations and to the International Encyclopedia of Dance.
The main focus of his writing was on dance, theater, music, art and film creating magnificent reports and articles for main newspapers and magazines including The New York Times, Vanity Fair, Dance, Elle, and Vogue.

Personal life
In 1978 when Tracy was 23 years old, he met Nureyev in New York City, where they began a love affair, for the first two and a half years living at Nureyev's New York apartment. They conducted an open relationship that lasted over 14 years until Nureyev's death. Nureyev employed Tracy as his personal assistant and production co-ordinator when working out of New York and Paris, while Tracy kept his teaching job at Fordham University.

During the long-term relationship, they entertained the idea of becoming parents and Nureyev had plans to father a child with Nastassja Kinski; a plan that never materialized. In 1985, Tracy and Nureyev were both tested positive for HIV/AIDS, first Nureyev in France in 1984.

Legal issue of same-sex couple
Nureyev declared Tracy as his live-in companion, and they were together until Nureyev's death in 1993.  Since Nureyev made no will, U.S. law only recognized them as lovers and not as spouses for inheritance purposes. Nureyev's fortune, estimated at US$33 million at the time, was transferred by his lawyer to a created foundation named after him.

Eventually, under a legal agreement with the foundation which recognized Tracy's partner entitlement to some security after their life-long relationship, he received $600,000, paid in small installments with the condition that he could not talk publicly about their relationship, write a book or sell this information to the media during his lifetime. On June 7, 2007, Tracy died from complications of AIDS; upon his death the information was revealed by The New York Times with the legal consent of the Nureyev Foundation.

References

20th-century American dancers
20th-century American writers
American LGBT rights activists
HIV/AIDS activists
Fordham University faculty
Skidmore College alumni
1955 births
2007 deaths
AIDS-related deaths in New York (state)
LGBT people from Massachusetts
20th-century American LGBT people